Gyeongbuk College of Health is a private university located in Gimcheon, South Korea.

External links

Gimcheon
Private universities and colleges in South Korea
Universities and colleges in North Gyeongsang Province
Educational institutions established in 1956
1956 establishments in South Korea